Sandra Denise "Sandy" Lister (born 16 August 1961 in Halifax, West Yorkshire) is a former field hockey player, who was a member of the British squad that won the bronze medal at the 1992 Summer Olympics in Barcelona. She competed in three consecutive Summer Olympics, starting in 1988. She then went into coaching with the Ipswich Ladies 1st Team for several years, winning the National Cup Title in 2002. She retired from professional coaching in 2007, although continues to teach at Ipswich High School,  in Suffolk.

References

External links
 
 
 

English female field hockey players
Field hockey players at the 1992 Summer Olympics
Olympic field hockey players of Great Britain
British female field hockey players
Olympic bronze medallists for Great Britain
1961 births
Living people
Place of birth missing (living people)
Olympic medalists in field hockey
Medalists at the 1992 Summer Olympics